Abdur Rezzak Khan (1900–1984) Bengali anti-British freedom fighter, communist revolutionary and politician. He was a member of the West Bengal Legislative Assembly in 1969.

Background
He was born in June 1900 at Hakimpur,  24 parganas of Bengal Presidency, British India.

Political movement
During the Chittagong armoury raid led by Masterda Surya Sen, he secretly supplied arms. Santosh Kumar Mitra, a revolutionary martyr, was one of his companions. In 1922, he came in contact with Muzaffar Ahmed and  Abdul Halim. He was one of the founding member of the Workers and Peasants Party. He led a first time large-scale general strike of jute workers with Abdul Momin and others in 1929.

References 

Communist Party of India (Marxist) politicians from West Bengal
Bengali communists
1900 births
1984 deaths
West Bengal MLAs 1969–1971